The Italian general election of 2013 took place on 24–25 March 2013.

In its two single-seat constituencies, Aosta Valley elected Rudi Marguerettaz (Edelweiss, Aosta Valley) to the Chamber of Deputies and Albert Lanièce (Valdostan Union, Aosta Valley coalition) to the Senate.

Results
Chamber of Deputies

Source: Aosta Valley Region

Senate

Source: Aosta Valley Region

2013 elections in Italy
Elections in Aosta Valley
March 2013 events in Italy